Zine-Eddine Oulad M'Hand (born 20 August 2003), known as Salah-Eddine Oulad M'Hand, is a Dutch professional footballer who plays as a midfielder for Arsenal.

Club career
As a youth player, Oulad M'Hand joined the youth academy of Dutch side Feyenoord. In 2020, he joined the youth academy of English Premier League side Arsenal.

On 23 August 2022, he moved on loan to Hull City for the season, with an option for Hull to purchase the player at the end of the season. 

An injury that Oulad M'Hand picked up on Arsenal's pre-season tour of the United States meant that he had not made his first team debut by the time the Championship season took a break for the 2022 FIFA World Cup. During that break, Oulad M'Hand suffered a setback to that injury which meant he did not travel with the Hull City squad to their mid-season training camp in Turkey, with the player instead returning to Arsenal for treatment and aiming to make his debut for Hull before the end of the season.

International career
Born in the Netherlands, Oulad M'Hand is of Moroccan descent. He is a youth international for the Netherlands, having played for the Netherlands U15s.

Career statistics

References

External links
 Profile at the Arsenal F.C. website
 

2003 births
Living people
Dutch sportspeople of Moroccan descent
Dutch footballers
Association football midfielders
Netherlands youth international footballers
Arsenal F.C. players
Hull City A.F.C. players
Dutch expatriate footballers
Dutch expatriate sportspeople in England
Expatriate footballers in England